Anne-Fleur Sautour (born 2 February 1975) is a French female canoeist who won five medals at individual senior level at the Wildwater Canoeing World Championships and European Wildwater Championships.

References

1975 births
Living people
French female canoeists
Place of birth missing (living people)